Chulmleigh is a market town and civil parish in North Devon, England.

Chulmleigh may also refer to:
 Chulmleigh (horse) (1934 – after 1957), a British Thoroughbred racehorse
 SS Chulmleigh, a British merchant ship of the mid-20th century
 Chulmleigh College, an 11–16 mixed secondary school with academy status in Chulmleigh, Devon, England

See also
 
 Cholmondeley (disambiguation)
 Chumley (disambiguation)